Tim Atkin is a British Master of Wine, and a wine journalist, broadcaster and commentator. He is also a judge of several international wine competitions and a photographer.

Career
Atkin writes for a number of publications, including: a monthly column in Woman and Home, the Wine List Inspector for The Economist's Intelligent Life and Wine Editor at Large at Off Licence News. He also regularly contributes to: The World of Fine Wines, Imbibe, and Australian Gourmet Traveller Wine. On television, he appears regularly on BBC One's Saturday Kitchen as one of the programme's wine experts. In September 2012, Atkin appeared on a BBC One Inside Out programme about the English wine industry. On radio, he does interviews on Radio 4's Today Programme and Eddie Mair's PM show, among others.

Atkin judges several international wine competitions: he is as co-chairman of the International Wine Challenge and chairman of the New Wave Spain Awards, the South African Top 100 and the Vins de Pays Top 100. He speaks and teaches at wine conferences, wine associations, consumer, corporate and charity events.

Atkin is one of the Three Wine Men (together with Olly Smith and Oz Clarke), which holds events around the UK to bring wine consumers together with wine and food retailers and producers. Atkin's  have been published in The Guardian, The Telegraph and The World of Fine Wines and exhibited in Beirut, Gigondas and London.

Previously, Atkin published a column in The Observer, Observer Food Monthly, and his interviews were published in The Guardian and The Observer.

In early 2010, Atkin's weekly column in The Observer was reduced to two or three wine recommendations and he moved to The Times the following month, where he had a weekly column for a year. Atkin commented: "I am sad that The Observer has decided to reduce the scope of its wine coverage at a time when people need reliable advice more than ever. I will miss the challenge of writing what was (I hope) an engaging, informed and entertaining piece each week". In protest, a Facebook group called "Save the Wine Column" was formed and quickly amassed considerable support. At the time several newspapers had slashed their wine columns, for example The Sunday Times (Joanna Simon), The Independent on Sunday (Richard Ehrlich), and The Wall Street Journal (Dorothy Gaiter and John Brecher).

Education

Atkin holds a BA from Durham University in Modern Languages and a master's degree from the London School of Economics in European Studies. He became a Master of Wine in 2001, winning the Robert Mondavi Award for the best theory examination. He is a Caballero del Vino, a Chevalier du Tastevin and a member of the Ordre du Bontemps.

Awards

1988, 1990, 1993, 2004, 2006: Glenfiddich Wine Writer of the Year
1991, 1992, 1994, 1996: UK Wine Guild Wine Correspondent of the Year
1994: Wines of France Award
1995: The Bunch Award for Wine Journalism
1995: Waterford Crystal Wine Correspondent of the Year
1999, 2002, 2003, 2004: Lanson Black Label Award
2005: Wines of Portugal Award
2007: International Wine & Spirit Communicator of the Year
2007: World Food Media Awards Best Drink Journalist
2009: Louis Roederer International Wine Columnist of the Year
 2011: Born Digital Award for www.timatkin.com and Louis Roederer Wine Website of the Year
 2013: Louis Roederer Wine Website of the Year
 2014: Fortnum & Mason Awards Online Drink Writer of the Year, Louis Roederer Online Communicator of the Year Award, Harpers' French Wine Awards Best French Wine Writer/Critic Award
 2015: Louis Roederer Feature Writer of the Year Award
 2018: Louis Roederer Online Communicator of the Year Award

See also
List of wine personalities

References

External links
 

Year of birth missing (living people)
Living people
Wine critics
Masters of Wine
Alumni of University College, Durham